Jean Lee Latham (April 19, 1902 – June 13, 1995) was an American writer who specialized in biographies for children or young adults.

Biography
Jean Lee Latham was born in Buckhannon, West Virginia. Her father was a cabinetmaker and her mother was a teacher. She attended West Virginia Wesleyan College and received an A.B. in 1925. She also attended Ithaca Conservatory. While in Wesleyan College, she wrote plays. In Ithaca, she taught English, history and play production. She continued teaching in Ithaca after finishing her studies at Cornell. Her first book for children was The Story of Eli Whitney. Her book Carry On, Mr. Bowditch won the Newbery Medal in 1956.

WorldCat reports that 12 of her 13 books most widely held in participating libraries are biographies of Bowditch (fictionalized), Eli Whitney, Samuel Morse, Rachel Carson, Elizabeth Blackwell, Francis Drake, Cyrus W. Field, Sam Houston (two, one brief and one fictionalized), David Farragut, John Ericsson, and James Cook. The other, This dear-bought land (1957), features "a fifteen-year-old boy [who] joins the expeditionary force that hopes to establish a permanent English colony in Virginia."

Awards
 Newbery Medal, 1956

References

External links

Jean Latham at West Virginia Wesleyan College
 Jean Lee Latham at Library of Congress Authorities — with 91 catalog records under that name, plus others

1902 births
1995 deaths
American children's writers
Newbery Medal winners
Writers from West Virginia
Educators from West Virginia
American women educators
People from Buckhannon, West Virginia
West Virginia Wesleyan College alumni
Ithaca College alumni
Cornell University alumni
Place of death missing
20th-century American biographers
American women children's writers
20th-century American women writers
American women biographers